Robert Ciboule (died 1458) was a French Roman Catholic theologian and moralist.

References

French Christian theologians
1458 deaths
Year of birth unknown